Dört Dörtlük (Perfect) is the sixth studio album by Turkish singer Bengü. It was released on 9 June 2011 by Avrupa Müzik.

Track listing

Charts

Sales

References 

Bengü albums
2011 albums